Glenister is a surname. It may refer to:

John Glenister (born 1932), British television director
Mikey Glenister (born 1984), British musician
Norm Glenister (1915–1963), Australian football player
Philip Glenister (born 1963), British actor
Robert Glenister (born 1960), British actor
Stewart Glenister (born 1988), American Samoan swimmer

English-language surnames